Agnes Bugge (born before 1417) was an English brewer. Bugge is notable because she was a woman brewer in the 15th/16th century.

Usually wives assisted their husbands and their contribution is never identified in the records. In Agnes' case her husband was a draper and therefore it becomes clear that it was Agnes who brewed. This is noted in 1419/20 when the brewers were in dispute with the City of London. The brewers agreed to create a fighting fund and Stephen paid the largest contribution for his wife's brewery. Idonea Hatton's husband also made a contribution but in her case they had the brewery jointly. 19 of the 24 breweries involved included women but the Bugge's brewery appeared to the only one operated by a woman, although it was noted that 80% of the breweries were run in part by a married woman. When Stephen died it becomes clear how the law saw the situation, as Stephen had to leave Agnes' brewery to her. The funds raised won the case against the city of London. At that time the Lord Mayor of London was Dick Whittington.

References

Breweries in London
14th-century births
15th-century deaths
People from London
15th-century English businesspeople
Medieval English merchants
Medieval businesswomen
Women in brewing